Spilia is a village located in Agia Paraskevi municipal unit, Kozani regional unit, West Macedonia, Greece. Ptolemaida is 25 km northwest of Spilia.

Spilia is situated at an altitude of 820 meters. The postal code is 50200, while the telephone code is +30 24630 . At the 2011 census, the population was 69.

Archaeological site
A portion of Via Egnatia, an ancient Roman road, passes through Spilia.  An archaeological site of the ancient Macedonian tomb of Eordaia (Greek: Μακεδονικός τάφος Σπηλιάς) is located in Spilia along this road. The architectural form shows the tomb and monument to be in the same category as tombs of Philip II, Vergina, and Leukadia.

References

Populated places in Kozani (regional unit)